Richard Overton is an American sound engineer. He was nominated for three Academy Awards in the category Best Sound. He worked on more than 60 films during his career.

Selected filmography
 Die Hard (1988)
 The Abyss (1989)
 The Hunt for Red October (1990)

References

External links

Year of birth missing
Possibly living people
American audio engineers
Emmy Award winners